Referans was a daily Turkish language business-and-economics newspaper, published in Istanbul. It was taken over in 2004 by Aydın Doğan's Doğan Media Group, and in 2010 merged with the group's paper Radikal. Its final editor was Eyüp Can.

From its foundation until 31 May 2004 it was run by the Financial Forum.

References

1996 establishments in Turkey
2010 disestablishments in Turkey
Business newspapers
Defunct newspapers published in Turkey
Doğan Media Group
Newspapers published in Istanbul
Newspapers established in 1996
Publications disestablished in 2010
Turkish-language newspapers
Daily newspapers published in Turkey